PP-219 Multan-IX is a Constituency of Provincial Assembly of Punjab.

See also
 PP-218 Multan-VIII
 PP-220 Multan-X

References

External links
 Election commission Pakistan's official website
 Awazoday.com check result
 Official Website of Government of Punjab

Provincial constituencies of Punjab, Pakistan